The Lordship of Villena was a feudal state located in southern Spain, in the kingdom of Castile. It bordered to the north with Cuenca and to south with the city of Murcia. The territory was structured in two political centers: the Land of Alarcón, to the north, and the Land of Chinchilla to the south. Less central were the towns of Iniesta, the Land of Jorquera, Hellín, Tobarra, Almansa, Yecla, Sax and Villena, which, despite giving the name to the lordship, was territorially peripheral, although it previously included the cities along Vinalopó river (Sax, Elda, Novelda, Elche). The borders changed with the time, provided the temporary addition of some towns (Villarrobledo, Lezuza, Munera, Jumilla and Utiel in the 15th century) and the loss of some other towns.

The lordship has a double historical origin. On the one side, the towns and villages of the Land of Jorquera, Hellín, Ves, Tobarra, Almansa, Yecla, Sax and Villena were owned by Infante Manuel of Castile, so it began to be called the Land of don Manuel. On the other side, the Land of Alarcón and Iniesta belonged to the crown during the 12th and 13th centuries, being incorporated to the lordship by Juan Manuel, Prince of Villena, who had a very wide jurisdiction in his land and made it become a dukedom and, finally, a principate.

References

Bibliography 
 
 

Dukedoms of Spain
Principalities
Crown of Aragon
Kingdom of Castile
Villena